Walworth Grade School is a PreK-8 public grade school located in South Central Walworth County in the Village of Walworth, Wisconsin. Walworth Elementary serves as a "feeder" school for Big Foot High School as part of the Big Foot Area Schools Association.  Walworth Joint School District #1 is governed by a five-member board of education.

Statistics
District Administrator: Mr. Phill Klamm

Principal: Caitlin Dowden,

Team name: Walworth Wildcats (formerly Walworth Warriors)

References

External links

Education in Walworth County, Wisconsin
School districts in Wisconsin
1856 establishments in Wisconsin
School districts established in 1856